Series 22 of British television drama The Bill was broadcast from 4 January until 28 December 2006. The series consisted of 91 episodes, as two episodes from the series remain unaired after the master tapes were stolen in a robbery at the show's recording studios in November 2006. Under new producer Johnathan Young, this series saw the programme begin to step away from the serialised format, and return much of the focus to the actual policing aspect of the programme, removing the more 'soap' feel previously introduced by Paul Marquess. Most episodes consisted of two parallel stories running at the same time, much like the initial transition to hour-long episodes in 1998. However, some episodes feature entirely on one story, beginning the move back to single-themed episodes as part of a plan to completely remove serialisation - which did not take place until 2007. The series also saw a large portion of cast changes in the first few months, with a number of characters previously introduced by Marquess being axed to make way for new blood - many of them support staff and non-police officer characters. Young believed that several of the characters introduced by Marquess did not have the longevity of the more well-known characters in the show, and thus decided to give a number of highly recommended up-and-coming actors roles on the show, such as Kidulthood star Aml Ameen.

One of the most prominent characters to leave was Superintendent Adam Okaro (Cyril Nri), whose promotion to Borough Commander saw his position replaced by new Superintendent John Heaton (Daniel Flynn). Despite a number of high-profile exits, it was the first year since 2001 that a police officer character was not killed off; however, a handful of recurring non-police characters were killed off, including Sgt. Dale Smith's girlfriend Louise Larson and PC Tony Stamp's father Norman (John Woodvine). Young did state at the start of his tenure that he had no intention to axe any of the staple characters, such as veterans of over 20 years Tony Stamp and Reg Hollis, however, it had already been announced in the autumn of 2005 that Trudie Goodwin would be quitting her role on the series as Sergeant June Ackland. While June would not exit until the following year, Richard Hope of the by-then defunct sister series Murder Investigation Team was cast as schoolteacher Rod Jessop as part of a long-running story arc for June that saw her get engaged to him as part of her exit storyline. Other long-running story arcs introduced in this series were also not concluded until Series 23, such as the disappearance of schoolgirl Amy Tennant, and DC Zain Nadir's undercover operation and subsequent romance with drugs baron Kristen Shaw (Christine Stephen-Daly). Other long-term plots included PC Roger Valentine fighting his own skepticism to seek help for PTSD, brought on by a fatal disaster at a nightclub, culminating in a suicide attempt.

On 5 February 2014, the complete series was released on DVD in Australia as a Region 0, playable anywhere in the world.

Cast changes

Arrivals
 PC Emma Keane (Wrong Place, Wrong Time -)
 PC Lewis Hardy (Wrong Place, Wrong Time -)
 DOPA Mia Perry (Missing (Part 1) -)
 DC Stuart Turner (High Flyers -)
 CPS Lawyer Matt Hinckley (The Green Eyed Monster -)
 DAC Georgia Hobbs (Mistaken and Misspoken -)
 TDC Kezia Walker (Lack of Restraint -)
 Supt John Heaton (Hit the Ground Running -)
 PC Diane Noble (Little Black Book -)
 Sgt Nikki Wright (Honour Amongst Thieves -)

Departures
 SRO Julian Tavell – Leaves to emigrate to Spain
 CADO Dean McVerry – Leaves to emigrate abroad
 DS Ramani DeCosta – Transfers to the Child Abuse Investigation Team at New Scotland Yard
 PC Steve Hunter – Transfers to Derbyshire Constabulary
 PC Laura Bryant – Transfers to the Safer Neighbourhood Team at Barton Street
 DC Suzie Sim – Promoted to DS and transfers to the Kidnap squad at New Scotland Yard
 Chief Supt Adam Okaro – Promoted to borough commander
 PC Yvonne Hemmingway – Promoted to sergeant and transfers to the Youth Offenders Team

Episodes

Unaired episodes

References

2006 British television seasons
The Bill series